Kafubu may refer to:

Kafubu, Namibia, village in Namibia
Kafubu Stadium, stadium in Luanshya, Zambia
Kafubu (bug), a genus of shield bugs in the subfamily Phyllocephalinae